János (Anasztáz) Brenner (17 December 1931 – 15 December 1957) was a Hungarian Roman Catholic priest and professed member of the Cistercian Order. Brenner studied for the priesthood during a period of communist persecution of religious orders. Communist authorities came to suspect him of being critical of their regime; his success as a youth chaplain made him a threat. As a consequence, he was murdered by hired men who stabbed him 32 times and inflicted severe wounds to his head. He died soon after having been hurled into a ditch in the woods. The beatification took place on 1 May 2018 in Szombathely.

Life
János Brenner was born on 17 December 1931 in the Vas province as the second of three children. His two brothers also became priests.

He attended a Cistercian-run grammar school in Pécs from 1941 to 1946 after the Brenners moved there. He later attended the grammar school that the Premonstratensian Canons managed and passed his school examinations at the Cistercian school in Zirc. Brenner began his novitiate in 1950 with the Cistercians at Zirc and took the religious name "Anasztáz" (Anastasius: Greek for Resurrection). But a few months after, he had to interrupt his monastic formation when the communist regime began to suppress all religious houses in Hungary. The novice master, Lawrence Sigmond, sought to protect the young men undergoing formation and thus moved them from the abbey, placing them with families in private apartments. The novices-in-secret met clandestinely for formation and fellowship. Brenner was able to attend a diocesan seminary while staying in touch with Sigmond; he studied in Budapest and in Győr. On 19 June 1955, Janos was ordained to the priesthood in the diocesan cathedral of Szombathely by Bishop Sándor Kovács. 

Brenner's first assignment was to be a chaplain in St. Gotthard, a parish which had over previous centuries been in Cistercian care. After the communists made personal threats against the enthusiastic and idealistic chaplain, his bishop offered to send Brenner elsewhere, but he said, "I'm not afraid" and affirmed his desire to remain where he was.

Around midnight on 15 December, 1957 (Brenner was preparing his sermon for 16 December) he was called to give last rites to a supposedly ill man in a neighboring town; he failed to realize that it was a trap. The 17-year-old boy who summoned him had been known to Brenner as an altar server. The young priest took anointing oils and the Eucharist with him in his bag. He was soon ambushed in the woods and stabbed 32 times. He was found dead that morning with the Eucharist still in his hands, earning him the title "Hungarian Tarcisius" since he died in similar circumstances to Tarcisius.

Brenner was interred in the family vault in the Salesian church of Saint Quirinus on 18 December. The authorities made a failed attempt to disperse the crowd at his funeral.

Over the years, Catholics continued to venerate Brenner and visited his grave often. In 1989, the Chapel of the Good Pastor was built on the exact spot where the young priest had been murdered. In 1981 a stained glass window was dedicated to him in Saint Elizabeth's Church in his hometown.

Beatification
The beatification process opened under Pope John Paul II on 14 February 2001; the diocesan investigations opened on 3 October 1999 and concluded only a decade later. The Vatican later validated the process on 18 September 2009, and a commission of historians approved the cause on 4 September 2015. 

Pope Francis confirmed that Brenner died as a victim "in odium fidei" (in hatred of the faith). On 8 November 2017, the pontiff approved the priest's beatification. The solemn liturgy took place on 1 May 2018, in Szombathely's City Park.

References

External links
 Hagiography Circle

1931 births
1957 deaths
20th-century Hungarian Roman Catholic priests
20th-century Roman Catholic martyrs
20th-century venerated Christians
Beatifications by Pope Francis
Cistercians
Cistercian beatified people
Deaths by stabbing in Hungary
Hungarian beatified people
Hungarian murder victims
Martyred Roman Catholic priests
People from Szombathely
People murdered in Hungary
Venerated Catholics
1957 murders in Hungary